Silja Hauksdóttir (born ) is an Icelandic writer and film director.

After studying philosophy at the University of Iceland, Silja took courses in screenwriting, directing and cinematography at FAMU in Prague and Binger Filmlab in Amsterdam.

Sisterhood was the first Icelandic programme to be included in the streaming service Walter Presents.

She was also chosen to direct two editions of Áramótaskaupið – "The New Year's Lampoon" – in 2008 and 2014.

Her second full-length film, Agnes Joy, was released in 2019, for which she won the Edda Award for Best Film (Kvikmynd ársins).

Filmography 

As director:

  (2004)
 The Choir (Kórinn) (2005 documentary)
  (Stelpurnar) (2005 TV series)
 And It Was You (Og það varst þú) (2006 short)
 The Government (Ríkið) (2008 TV series)
  (2009–2013 TV series)
 Agnes Joy (2019)
 Sisterhood (Systrabönd) (2021 TV series)

References

External links 

 Silja Hauksdóttir at the Icelandic Film Centre
 

1976 births
Living people
Silja Hauksdóttir
Silja Hauksdóttir